Alessandra Giliani (1307-1326) was thought to be an Italian natural historian, best known as the first woman to be recorded in historical documents as practicing anatomy and pathology. However, the historical evidence for her existence is limited. Some scholars consider her to be a fiction invented by   Alessandro Machiavelli (1693-1766) . whilst others hold that the participation of a woman in anatomy at that time was so shocking that she has been edited out of history .

Giliani is believed to have been born in 1307, in San Giovanni in Persiceto, in the Italian province of Emilia-Romagna. The chronicle of her life holds that she died in 1326, possibly from a septic wound, at the age of 19.  Celebrated as the first female anatomist of the Western World, she is reputed to have been a brilliant prosector (preparer of corpses for anatomical dissection). She is said to have worked as the surgical assistant to Mondino de' Liuzzi (d. 1326), a world-renowned professor at the medical school of the University of Bologna. (Credited with being the father of modern anatomy, de' Liuzzi published a seminal text on the subject in 1316.)

Giliani is said to have carried out her own anatomical investigations, developing a method of draining the blood from a corpse and replacing it with a hardening coloured dye—and possibly adding to our understanding of the coronary-pulmonary circulatory system. (All evidence of her work was either lost or destroyed.)

Alessandra Giliani's short life was honoured by Otto Angenius, also one of Mondino's assistants and probably her fiancé, with a plaque at the "San Pietro e Marcellino degli Spedolari di Santa Maria di Mareto, o d'Ulmareto" which describes her work.

Legacy
She is mentioned by the nineteenth-century historian Michele Medici, who published a history of the Bolognese school of anatomy in 1857.

Barbara Quick's novel, A Golden Web, published by HarperTeen in 2010, is a fictional re-imagining of Alessandra Giliani's life and times.

References

1307 births
1326 deaths
Italian anatomists
History of anatomy
14th-century Italian scientists
People from San Giovanni in Persiceto
Italian women scientists
Women anatomists
14th-century Italian women